Washington Frederick Willcox (August 22, 1834 – March 8, 1909) was a U.S. Representative from Connecticut.

Biography
Born in Killingworth, Connecticut, Willcox prepared for college at Madison Academy and Hopkins Grammar School.  He graduated from Yale Law School in 1862.  He was admitted to the bar and commenced practice in Deep River, Connecticut.

He served as member of the Connecticut House of Representatives in 1862 and 1863.  From 1875 to 1876 he served in the Connecticut State Senate.  He was State's attorney of Middlesex County from 1875 to 1883.

Willcox was elected as a Democrat to the Fifty-first and Fifty-second Congresses (March 4, 1889 – March 3, 1893).  He was not a candidate for renomination in 1892.

He resumed the practice of law in Deep River, and also engaged in banking.  From 1897 to 1905 he served on the state Railroad Commission.

He died at his home in Chester, Connecticut, March 8, 1909, and was buried at Fountain Hill Cemetery in Deep River.

References

1834 births
1909 deaths
Hopkins School alumni
Yale Law School alumni
Democratic Party Connecticut state senators
Democratic Party members of the Connecticut House of Representatives
Democratic Party members of the United States House of Representatives from Connecticut
19th-century American politicians